The Standing Committee on Transport, Infrastructure and Communities (TRAN) is a committee in the House of Commons of Canada. It focuses on transport, infrastructure and communities. Before the 39th Parliament (2006-2008), the committee was known as just the Standing Committee on Transport.

Studies
Canada Post
Rail Safety
Safety solutions on all modes of transport
Transport security
Study on the review of Toronto Port Authority Report

Membership

Subcommittees
Subcommittee on Agenda and Procedure (STRA)

External links
 Standing Committee on Transport, Infrastructure and Communities (TRAN)

Transport